SFT is an initialism that could refer to:

 Sabrina Frederick-Traub (born 1996), Australian rules footballer nicknamed SFT
 Schema therapy
 Search For Technosignature
 Skellefteå Airport (IATA: SFT), Sweden
 Solitary fibrous tumor, a rare mesenchymal tumor
 Statens forurensningstilsyn or Norwegian Climate and Pollution Agency
 String field theory
 Striving For Togetherness Records
 Structural family therapy, a type of psychotherapy
 Students for a Free Tibet
 Proposed submerged floating tunnel
 Super fine TFT
 Symplectic Field Theory in Floer homology
 System Fault Tolerance in NetWare operating systems

See also
 Secure file transfer protocol (disambiguation)